Independence Square may refer to:

 Independence Square, Gyumri, Armenia
 Independence Square, at Pabna University of Science & Technology, Bangladesh
 Independence Square, Minsk, Belarus
 Independence Square, Sofia, Bulgaria
 Plaza de la Independencia, Quito, Ecuador
 Black Star Square, also called Independence Square, Accra, Ghana
 Merdeka Square, Jakarta, Indonesia
 Independence Square, Nur-Sultan, Astana, Kazakhstan
 Independence Square, Vilnius, Lithuania
 Merdeka Square, Kuala Lumpur, Malaysia
 Putrajaya Independence Square, Malaysia
 Independence Square outside St Paul's Pro-Cathedral, Valletta, Malta
 Independence Square in Choibalsan, Mongolia
 Independence Square (Podgorica), Montenegro
 Praça da Independência, Maputo, Mozambique
 Tinubu Square, Lagos Island, Lagos State, Nigeria
 Independence Square (Basseterre), Saint Kitts and Nevis
 Independence Square, Chachapoyas, Peru
 Independence Square, Colombo, Sri Lanka
 Onafhankelijkheidsplein, Paramaribo, Suriname
 Independence Square (Port of Spain), Trinidad and Tobago
 Independence Square, Ashgabat, Turkmenistan
 Independence Square, Kyiv, Ukraine
 Independence Square, Washington, District of Columbia, United States; a complex containing Two Independence Square
 Independence Square, Independence Hall in Philadelphia, Pennsylvania, United States
 Independence Square, Independence, Missouri, United States
 Plaza Independencia, Montevideo, Uruguay 
 Independence Square (Tashkent), Uzbekistan

See also 
 Arcade Independence Square, a shopping complex in Colombo, Sri Lanka
 Martyrs' Square (disambiguation)
 Merdeka Square (disambiguation)
 Freedom Square (disambiguation)
 Independence (disambiguation)
 Independence Hall (disambiguation)
 Independence Plaza (disambiguation)
 Two Independence Square, NASA Headquarters in Washington D.C.